The Thanks for the Book Award, (Kiitos kirjasta -mitali in Finnish and Tack för boken-medaljen in Swedish), is a Finnish literary prize that has been presented since 1966 by the Organization of the Booksellers’ Association of Finland (Kirjakauppaliitto r.y.), Libro ry and the Finnish Library Association (Suomen kirjastoseura ry).

The award is presented once a year to a Finnish author whose work of fiction the previous year has particularly stimulated literature in Finland. The book may have been written in Finnish or in Swedish.

Prizewinners 

 1966: Prinsessan by Gunnar Mattsson and Nuori metsästäjä by Jaakko Syrjä
 1967: Mörkrets kärna by Marianne Alopaeus
 1968: Arkkienkeli Oulussa by Anu Kaipainen and Hänen olivat linnut by Marja-Liisa Vartio
 1969: Tilapää by Eila Pennanen
 1970: Mustan lumen talvi by Kalle Päätalo
 1971: Solveigin laulu by Lassi Sinkkonen
 1972: Människan som skalv by Christer Kihlman
 1973: Varokaa, voittajat by Eeva-Liisa Manner
 1974: Simpauttaja by Heikki Turunen
 1975: Vetää kaikista ovista by Eeva Joenpelto
 1976: Dyre prins by Christer Kihlman
 1977: Ihmisen ääni by Elina Karjalainen
 1978: Ja pesäpuu itki by Matti Pulkkinen
 1979: Vuosisadan rakkaustarina by Märta Tikkanen
 1980: Hiljainen kesä by Eeva Tikka
 1981: Viistotaival by Orvokki Autio
 1982: Suruvaippa by Saara Finni
 1983: Pohjanmaa by Antti Tuuri
 1984: Vaiteliaat vuodet by Eila Kostamo
 1985: Häräntappoase by Anna-Leena Härkönen
 1986: Tainaron by Leena Krohn
 1987: Kertomus by Antti Hyry
 1988: Axel by Bo Carpelan
 1989: Tatuoitu sydän by Timo Pusa
 1990: Leo by Ulla-Lena Lundberg
 1991: Båten i vassen by Benedict Zilliacus
 1992: Tummien perhosten koti by Leena Lander
 1993: Colorado Avenue by Lars Sund
 1994: Ihon aika by Anja Snellman (née Kauranen)
 1995: Underbara kvinnor vid vatten by Monika Fagerholm
 1996: Liian paksu perhoseksi by Sisko Istanmäki
 1997: Drakarna över Helsingfors by Kjell Westö
 1998: Klassikko by Kari Hotakainen
 2001: Mansikoita marraskuussa by Pirjo Hassinen
 2002: Rajattomuuden aika by Eeva Kilpi
 2003: Auringon asema by Ranya Paasonen (née ElRamly)
 2004: Helene by Rakel Liehu
 2005: Vanikan palat  by Hannu Väisänen
 2006: Sarasvatin hiekkaa by Risto Isomäki
 2007: Viikkoja, kuukausia by Reko and Tina Lundán
 2008: Lakanasiivet by Sirpa Kähkönen
 2009: Marie by Arne Nevanlinna
 2010: Herra Darwinin puutarhuri by Kristina Carlson
 2011:	Mielensäpahoittaja by Tuomas Kyrö
 2012:	Kätilö (The Midwife) by Katja Kettu
 2013:	Nälkävuosi (White Hunger) by Aki Ollikainen
 2014:	Taivaslaulu by Pauliina Rauhala
 2015:	Neljäntienristeys by Tommi Kinnunen
 2016:	Paha kirja by Kaj Korkea-aho
 2017:	Lempi by Minna Rytisalo
 2018:	Sandra by Heidi Köngäs
 2019: I will never go back, I think by Satu Vasantola
 2020:  Feet in the Air by Antti Rönkä

References

 

Finnish literary awards
Fiction awards